Graf Zeppelin may refer to:

 Count Ferdinand Adolf Heinrich August Graf von Zeppelin (1838–1917), German officer, engineer, and founder of the Zeppelin airship company
 LZ 127 Graf Zeppelin, a German rigid airship 1928–1937, named after Count Zeppelin
 LZ 130 Graf Zeppelin II, the second airship of the Hindenburg class, 1938–1940, named after Count Zeppelin
 Graf Zeppelin-class aircraft carriers, two German Kriegsmarine aircraft carriers laid down in the mid-1930s, named after Count Zeppelin
 German aircraft carrier Graf Zeppelin, the first ship of this class
 Graf Zeppelin (march), a musical composition by Carl Teike

See also
Zeppelin (disambiguation)
1930 Graf Zeppelin stamps